Sidney Gerald Abel (February 22, 1918February 8, 2000) was a Canadian Hall of Fame hockey player, coach and general manager in the National Hockey League, most notably for the Detroit Red Wings, and was a member of three Stanley Cup-winning teams in 1943, 1950, and 1952. In 2017 Abel was named one of the '100 Greatest NHL Players' in history.

Playing career
Born in Melville, Saskatchewan, "Old Bootnose", as he was known, Abel joined the Red Wings in 1938 after playing junior hockey with the Flin Flon Bombers. He split the next two seasons between Detroit and their affiliates in the International-American Hockey League before becoming a full-time player in 1940. Abel was named captain of the Red Wings in 1942.

In 1943, Abel left the Red Wings to serve with the Royal Canadian Air Force during World War II. During this time he skated with the RCAF team in Montreal. Abel was demobilized late in the 1946 season, regaining his team captaincy, just in time for the playoffs.

In 1947, Abel and Ted Lindsay were teamed up with rookie right winger Gordie Howe as a forward line by Red Wings' coach Jack Adams.  While Abel's effectiveness late that season and in the playoffs was limited by an attack of pleurisy, the line paid immediate dividends, turning Lindsay into a star and leading the team to a playoff berth. The following season, Lindsay, Abel and Howe finished 1-3-4 in team scoring, while leading the Red Wings to the Stanley Cup Finals.

By the 1949 season, the newly dubbed "Production Line" led the Wings to the first of seven consecutive regular season first-place finishes, an unsurpassed NHL record, hampered only by serious injuries that cost Howe and Lindsay much of the season.  Abel was tied with Lindsay for third in NHL scoring while leading the league in goals and recording career highs in goals and assists, and was awarded the Hart Memorial Trophy as the league's Most Valuable Player, as well as being named to the First All-Star team.

The next three seasons saw Abel lead the Production Line to surpass any other forward line in points, and in 1950 season Lindsay, Abel and Howe finished 1-2-3 in league scoring, equalling the feat of the famed "Kraut Line" of the Boston Bruins from 1939 to 1940. Abel repeated his first All-Star team honour in 1950 en route to playing for his second Stanley Cup champion, and was named Second Team All-Star in 1951.

Abel was traded from the Red Wings to the Black Hawks for cash in 1952, and was named coach of the team. He served as player-coach for the next two seasons, and was the last full-time player-head coach in NHL history.

Though his No. 12 was honoured by the Wings, Abel wore 4, 7, 9, 12, 14, 19 and 20 throughout his career. Most of those numbers came during his first two seasons, where he split time between the Red Wings and the minors, before settling on number 12. He wore 9 during his return at the end of the 1945–46 season, as Joe Carveth had worn 12 during Abel's military service, and Abel regained his familiar number when Carveth was traded to the Boston Bruins.

Coaching
Abel was the head coach of the Chicago Black Hawks for two seasons from 1952–53 to 1953–54. He returned to the Red Wings in 1957–58 and served as Detroit's Head Coach through the 1969–70 season. Abel was the Red Wings General Manager from April 1962 until January 1971.

Abel was named General Manager of the expansion Kansas City Scouts for the 1974–75 season and served through the 1975–76 season until the franchise relocated to Denver to become the Colorado Rockies for the 1976–77 season. Abel also acted is interim Head Coach for the Kansas City Scouts for 3 games during the 1976 season.

In the 1970s and 1980s, Abel worked as a colour commentator on Red Wings radio and television broadcasts.

Legacy

Sid Abel was elected to the Hockey Hall of Fame in 1969.  In 1998, he was ranked number 85 on [[List of 100 greatest hockey players by The Hockey News|The Hockey News''' list of the 100 Greatest Hockey Players]].

Abel's older brother, George was a Canadian Olympic ice hockey player. In Olympic competition at Oslo, Norway, he scored the winning goal in the final game, securing the only Canadian gold medal of the Olympics. Sid's son Gerry also briefly played in the NHL, and his grandson Brent Johnson is a goaltender who last played for the Pittsburgh Penguins. Sid's son-in-law Bob Johnson was also a goaltender in the NHL.

Abel died on February 8, 2000, fourteen days away from his 82nd birthday.

Awards and achievements
 2-time NHL first team All-Star (1949, 1950)
 2-time NHL second team All-Star (1942, 1951)
 3-time Stanley Cup champion (1943, 1950, 1952)
 Hart Memorial Trophy (1949)
 Detroit Red Wings #12 retired on April 29, 1995
 In January 2017, Abel was part of the first group of players to be named one of the '100 Greatest NHL Players' in history.

 Career statistics 

* Stanley Cup Champion.

Coaching record

See also
 List of ice hockey line nicknames
 List of members of the Hockey Hall of Fame
 Notable families in the NHL
 Production line (hockey)
 Captain (ice hockey)

References

 Carroll, M. R. (2001). The Concise Encyclopedia of Hockey. Vancouver: Greystone Press.
 Diamond, Dan and Eric Zweig, eds (2003). Hockey's Glory Days: the 50s and 60s. Kansas City: Andrew McMeel.
 Fischler, Stan (2002). Detroit Red Wings: Greatest Moments and Players''. Sports Publishing Co.

External links
 

1918 births
2000 deaths
Canadian ice hockey left wingers
Chicago Blackhawks coaches
Chicago Blackhawks players
Detroit Red Wings announcers
Detroit Red Wings captains
Detroit Red Wings coaches
Detroit Red Wings general managers
Detroit Red Wings players
Hart Memorial Trophy winners
Hockey Hall of Fame inductees
Ice hockey people from Saskatchewan
Sportspeople from Melville, Saskatchewan
Kansas City Scouts
Kansas City Scouts coaches
National Hockey League broadcasters
National Hockey League players with retired numbers
Pittsburgh Hornets players
St. Louis Blues coaches
Stanley Cup champions
Ice hockey player-coaches
Canadian ice hockey coaches
Royal Canadian Air Force personnel of World War II